The Avion II (originally referred to as the Zephyr (west wind) or the Éole II) was the second primitive aircraft designed by Clément Ader in the 1893. Most sources agree that work on it was never completed, Ader abandoning it in favour of the Avion III that had a financial backer. Ader's later claim that he flew the Avion II in August 1892 for a distance of 100 m at a field in Satory is not widely accepted.

Design and development
The name "Avion" was devised by Ader from Latin avis ("bird") and became the origin of the word avion, the most common in French to designate an airplane (heavier-than-air aircraft). The first official text noting it is French patent no. 205 555 granted to Ader on April 19, 1890.

The engine developed for Avion II, called Zéphyr was a light steam engine driving a  diameter 4-bladed propeller, in which steam was cooled through a condenser.

See also

Notes

References

19th-century French experimental aircraft
Steam-powered aircraft